Justice Arijit Pasayat is a former judge of the Supreme Court of India. He hails from Orissa, where he practised in matters relating to taxation and constitutional affairs before the Orissa High Court.

Career
Justice Pasayat started his career in litigation on 10 October 1968, when he was enrolled to the bar as an advocate. In this role, he practiced before the Orissa High Court in taxation and constitutional matters while also taking up other commercial cases. He simultaneously pursued the examination of chartered accountant and completed the mandatory article-ship, and also passed the Intermediate Chartered Accountancy Examination.

He was appointed an additional judge in the Orissa High Court on 20 March 1989. He was then appointed the chief justice of the Kerala High Court on 20 September 1999. He was subsequently transferred and appointed the chief justice of Delhi High Court on 10 May 2000.

Justice Pasayat was elevated as a judge of the Supreme Court of India on 20 October 2001, and retired on 10 May 2009.

Prominent cases 

Among the most notable of his decisions, he was the part of a constitutional bench of the Supreme Court which decided upon the constitutional validity of the reservation to 'other backwards classes' (OBCs) in national level institutions such as the IITs and the IIMs.

References

Further reading 
 Justice Pasayat in news 1,

See also 
 Supreme Court of India
 Ashoka Kumar Thakur vs. Union of India (Supreme Court Case)

1944 births
Living people
Judges of the Orissa High Court
Chief Justices of the Kerala High Court
Chief Justices of the Delhi High Court
20th-century Indian judges
Justices of the Supreme Court of India